Western Shoshone comprise several Shoshone  tribes that are indigenous to the Great Basin and have lands identified in the Treaty of Ruby Valley 1863. They resided in Idaho, Nevada, California, and Utah. The tribes are very closely related culturally to the Paiute, Goshute, Bannock, Ute, and Timbisha tribes.

They speak the Western dialect of the Shoshone language.  Other Shoshone-speaking groups include the Goshute (Utah-Nevada border), Northern Shoshone (southern Idaho), and Eastern Shoshone (western Wyoming).

Bands

Bands of Western Shoshone are named for their traditional geographical homelands and their primary food sources.

Kuyatikka (Kuyudikka, Bitterroot Eaters), Halleck, Mary's River, Clover Valley, Smith Creek Valley, Nevada
Mahaguadüka (Mentzelia Seed Eaters), Reese River, Ruby Valley, Nevada
Painkwitikka (Penkwitikka, Fish Eaters), Cache Valley, Idaho and Utah
Tipatikka (Tepattekka'a, Tetadeka, Pinenut Eaters, Bia Tevateka), northernmost band, northern Utah
Tosawiˑccɨh (Tosaˑwihi, Dosawii, White Knife Shoshone), Battle Mountain, Nevada (perhaps variant name for the Tsogwiyuyugi) 
Tsaiduka (Tule Eaters), Railroad Valley, Nevada
Tsogwiyuyugi, Elko County, Nevada
Waitikka (Ricegrass Eaters), Ione Valley, Nevada
Watatikka (Ryegrass Seed Eaters), Ruby Valley, Nevada
Wiyimpihtikka (Buffalo Berry Eaters), Big Smoky Valley, Nevada:

Tribes
Federally recognized Western Shoshone tribes include:
 Duckwater Shoshone Tribe of the Duckwater Reservation, Nevada
 Ely Shoshone Tribe of Nevada
 Fort McDermitt Paiute and Shoshone Tribes of the Fort McDermitt Indian Reservation, Nevada and Oregon
 Northwestern Band of the Shoshone Nation, Utah
 Paiute-Shoshone Tribe of the Fallon Reservation and Colony, Nevada
 Reno-Sparks Indian Colony, Nevada
 Shoshone-Paiute Tribes of the Duck Valley Reservation, Nevada
 Te-Moak Tribe of Western Shoshone Indians of Nevada
Battle Mountain Band
Elko Band
South Fork Band
Wells Band
Yomba Shoshone Tribe of the Yomba Reservation, Nevada.

Legal battles

The Western Shoshone have been engaged in legal battles with the federal government over rights to their land since the erroneous filing of a claim in 1951 for land presumed to have been taken. Most western states comprising the Great Basin were created by federal statutes that referenced that "no part of Indian country will be included into the boundaries or jurisdiction of any state or territory ...without the consent of the Indians". During the American Civil War 1861–1864, gold was needed from the west by the Union to prosecute the war against the south. 

The Doty treaties were entered into by the US with the Shoshone. In 1863 the Treaty of Ruby Valley was entered into with the Western Bands of the Shoshone Nation (18 Statute 689–692) and identified the boundaries of their  territory. The Western Shoshone did not consent to the inclusion of their property into the boundaries or jurisdiction of any state or territory. The Western Shoshone possess all the interests the United States sought to purchase by the treaty for $5,000 per year for 20 years. The treaty was also used by the Union to demonstrate to European governments and banks backing the Union that it could do what it said and provide the gold needed for the war. "the treaty is in full force and effect" The United States failed to make any, but the first payment. 

The 326-k claim was $1.05 per acre for 26,000 million acres but did not in fact constitute a transfer of rights, title and interest since the Treaty of Ruby Valley is controlling. These facts are the basis for the failure of the United States Department of Energy to prove ownership to the proposed Yucca Mountain nuclear waste repository and the withdrawal of the license application. In 1979 Congress appropriated $26 million to settle the land claims, but the tribes said they wanted the US to abide by the 1863 treaty and stop trespassing on their lands. 

In 1985 the US Supreme Court ruled in the US v. Dann that the appropriation of funds by Congress and the acceptance by the Secretary of the Interior constitutes "payment" and effects Section 70 U of the ICC Act and forever bars further claims and Western Shoshone title is 'presumed to be extinguished', but the tribes have left the money with the government.  As recently as 2004, Congress has attempted to force the purchase of Western Shoshone land but this has been opposed by the majority of tribal leaders.  Disputes over tribal land and the international recognition by the United Nations of their struggle against the United States government is documented in the 2008 film American Outrage.

Western Shoshone have demonstrated  related to a number of issues as they try to protect their property; they have called for an end to nuclear testing within their country as well as filing injunctions against gold mining that would result in dewatering of Mount Tenabo, Nevada.

Passports
The Western Shoshone have issued their own passports since 1992. In 2010, when Timbisha Shoshone Chairman Joe Kennedy and Western Shoshone elder Carrie Dann went to the World Peoples Conference on Climate Change and the Rights of Mother Earth in Cochabamba, Bolivia, Chairman Kennedy traveled on his Western Shoshone passport. For further information on passport issues, see the Iroquois passport.

Notable Western Shoshone
Ned Blackhawk (Te-Moak), historian and professor at Yale
Carrie Dann, elder and lands right activist
Mary Dann, elder and land rights activist
Corbin Harney, elder and anti-nuclear activist
Darlene Cheryl Murphy (maiden name: Darrough) elder that speaks Shoshone fluently, and she is a retired NDOT Engineer. Commended by many for her beadwork, basket weaving, and for all of the years she spent pushing for the Western Shoshone people to receive their rightful portion of millions of dollars accumulating interest sitting in an account from the U.S. Government (activists who were members of the Western Shoshone slowed distribution down by demanding money and land) but Darlene spoke for herself, her daughter, and her grandchildren stating she was not demanding anything. But that she wanted to be able to see this money before her life is over. Sadly her father died before the money was distributed. She has made good choices in life with the thought of her dad always watching over her, so she only wanted to make him proud.
After many years of Darlene relentlessly contacting political officials personally and traveling to Washington D.C. to speak to them face to face, she was respectfully heard, which lead to the Western Shoshone money finally being distributed. Approximately $22,500.00 was given to each qualifying Western Shoshone, compensation from the U.S. Government for the inhumane sufferings their ancestors and relatives unforgettably endured.

See also
Western Shoshone Claims Distribution Act of 2004

Notes

References
 Kroeber, A. L. 1925. Handbook of the Indians of California. Bureau of American Ethnology Bulletin No. 78. Washington, D.C.
 Thomas, David H., Lorann S.A. Pendleton, and Stephen C. Cappannari. "Western Shoshone." Warren L. d'Azevedo, volume editor. Handbook of North American Indians: Great Basin, Volume 11.  Washington, DC: Smithsonian Institution, 1986: 262–283. .
 "Western Shoshone Struggle Earns World Recognition"

External links
http://www.nativecommunityactioncouncil.org
http://www.poohabah.org
Ely Shoshone Reservation
Goshute Indian Reservation
Great Basin Indian Archives
Te-Moak Tribe of the Western Shoshone Indians of Nevada
Timbisha Tribe of the Western Shoshone Nation
U.S. Treaty with the Western Shoshone 1863, Ruby Valley
Western Shoshone Defense Project Records, Special Collections, University Libraries, University of Nevada, Reno.

 
Native American tribes in California
Native American tribes in Nevada
Native American tribes in Utah
Native American tribes in Idaho